Turkish civil war may refer to:

 Ottoman Interregnum
 Turkish War of Independence
 Political violence in Turkey (1976–1980)
 Kurdish–Turkish conflict (1978–present)

See also
Ottoman civil war (disambiguation)